The 2011–12 Wessex Football League was the 26th season of the Wessex Football League. The league champions for the third time in their history were Winchester City, who were promoted to the Southern League. There was the usual programme of promotion and relegation between the two Wessex League divisions.

For sponsorship reasons, the league was known as the Sydenhams Wessex League.

League tables

Premier Division
The Premier Division consisted of 22 clubs, the same as the previous season, after Poole Town were promoted to the Southern League, and Brockenhurst were relegated to Division One. Two new clubs joined:
Downton, champions of Division One.
Horndean, runners-up in Division One.
Hamble A.S.S.C. changed their name to GE Hamble.

Division One
Division One consisted of 18 clubs, reduced from 19 the previous season, after Downton and Horndean were promoted to the Premier Division, and Shaftesbury were relegated to the Dorset Premier League. Two clubs joined:
Brockenhurst, relegated from the Premier Division.
Team Solent, joining from the Hampshire League.

References

Wessex Football League seasons
9